The tolai hare (Lepus tolai) is a species of hare native to Central Asia, Mongolia, and Northern and Central China. It inhabits semi-desert, steppes, rocky habitats, and forest meadows. It is relatively common, even in areas with heavy human disturbance, due to its fast reproductive rate. It is mainly active at dusk and at night but is occasionally active during the day.

The taxon is formerly included with the cape hare.

Description
It is rather variable in colouration across its range. The upper parts are some shade of dull yellow, pale brown, or sandy grey with brownish or reddish stripes. The hip region is sometimes ochre or grey. The head has a pale, bare, greyish or ochraceous patch of skin surrounding the eye and extending forwards to near the muzzle and backwards to the base of the long ears, which have black tips. The underparts and flanks are pure white. The tail has a broad black or brownish-black stripe on the top.

Distribution and habitat
The tolai hare is native to central and eastern Asia. Its range extends from the eastern side of the Caspian Sea through Iran, Afghanistan, Kazakhstan, Turkmenistan, Uzbekistan and Kyrgyzstan, through southern Siberia and Mongolia to western, central and north-eastern China. It is a creature of semi-arid steppe, mountain steppe, rocky areas, rough grassland and forest grassland, preferring shrubby areas where there is plenty of cover.

Ecology

The tolai hare is a nocturnal species and feeds on grasses, herbaceous plants and roots. It does not dig a burrow except when it is breeding, but scrapes out a depression in the ground in which to lie; this scoop is shallow in hot weather but is deeper in colder conditions. Breeding takes place two or three times a year, with litters of two to six young being produced each time.

In the neolithic Yangjiesha site of Loess Plateau, signs of commensal behavior (taming) between local tolai hares and humans can be found.

Status
The tolai hare has a wide range and is generally a common species. It is hunted in places for its meat and skin, and in Mongolia it is used in traditional medicine. It is present in a number of protected areas, and the International Union for Conservation of Nature has assessed its conservation status as being of "least concern".

References

Lepus
Mammals of Pakistan
Mammals described in 1778